Miles David Spector (born 4 August 1934) is an English professional footballer who played for Hendon and Chelsea as a centre forward.

References 

1934 births
English footballers
Living people
Association football forwards
Footballers from Hendon
Chelsea F.C. players